Lewisham Shopping Centre, formerly Riverdale Centre, is a shopping mall located in Lewisham, London, England. The centre is the major shopping centre in the London Borough of Lewisham. Also part of the complex is the Lewisham House office tower, formerly occupied by Citibank. There are proposals to convert this building to flats.

The centre is located in Lewisham town centre and was built over the former streets Rhyme Road and Romer Avenue. The official address is on Molesworth Street (a dual carriageway section of the A21). The car park is located on the upper levels. Facilities at the centre include public toilets with baby changing, photobooths and ATMs.

Since the Docklands Light Railway extension from Island Gardens reached Lewisham the centre experienced an increase in customers.

Stores

The largest stores in the centre are Sainsbury's, Marks and Spencer, H&M and Argos.

The Model Market is a street food market at the south end of the site, which opens in the summer months.

Transport
Docklands Light Railway - At Lewisham station, which is just a couple of minutes away. The DLR has services to Greenwich, Isle of Dogs (for Canary Wharf and the Docklands area), Stratford and the City.
Southeastern - Train services to destinations including Central London, Dartford, and Kent.
There are bus stops on both sides of the centre and Lewisham Bus station outside the train station, for services to Croydon, Bromley, Bexleyheath, and Woolwich.

References

External links
Official Site

Shopping centres in the London Borough of Lewisham
Tourist attractions in the London Borough of Lewisham
Shopping malls established in 1977
1977 establishments in England